Strule Arts Centre (Ulster-Scots: Strule Hoose o Airts) is a multi-purpose arts venue in Omagh, County Tyrone, Northern Ireland. The Omagh tourist information office is located on the ground floor. The centre is owned and run by Omagh District Council.

History
In 2003 Omagh's Town Hall was demolished to make way for the new Strule Arts Centre Arts. It cost £10.5 million and opened on 8 June 2007, overlooking the River Strule which flows through the town centre. It is part of a wider regeneration project for the High Street, George Street and Riverside area of Omagh. It was designed by architects Kennedy Fitzgerald and Associates. The centre was officially opened in January 2008 by Edwin Poots, then Minister for Culture, Arts and Leisure, and Margaret Ritchie, Minister for Social Development.

References

External links

Omagh
Arts centres in Northern Ireland
Buildings and structures in County Tyrone
Tourist attractions in County Tyrone
Art museums and galleries in Northern Ireland